Roméo Gagné (September 15, 1905 – August 2, 1959) was a Canadian politician and a two-term Member of the Legislative Assembly of Quebec.

Background

He was born on September 15, 1905 in Mont-Joli, Bas-Saint-Laurent.

City Councillor

Gagné was a city councillor in Rivière-du-Loup from 1945 to 1951.

Member of the legislature

He ran as a Union Nationale candidate in the 1944 and 1948 elections against Liberal incumbent Léon Casgrain in the district of Rivière-du-Loup.  He lost the first time, but was successful on his second attempt.

Gagné was re-elected in the 1952 election, but did not run for re-election in the 1956 election.

Death

Casgrain died on August 2, 1959.

References

1905 births
1959 deaths
Union Nationale (Quebec) MNAs